Aliabad-e Aq Hesar (also Romanized as ‘Alīābād-e Āq Ḩeşār; also known as ‘Alīābād-e Jowraqān, ‘Alīābād-e Jowzaghān, and ‘Alīābād-e Jūrūghān) is a village in Hegmataneh Rural District, in the Central District of Hamadan County, Hamadan Province, Iran. At the 2006 census, its population was 257, in 55 families.

References 

Populated places in Hamadan County